Claudiopolis (Greek: , city of Claudius) was an ancient city of Galatia mentioned by Ptolemy as belonging to the Trocmi.  It sat on the Halys river, northwest of Carissa; but its site has not been located.  From its name one can adduce that it was named for Roman emperor Claudius.

References

Ancient Greek archaeological sites in Turkey
Populated places in ancient Galatia
Roman sites in Turkey
Former populated places in Turkey